Top Country Albums is a chart that ranks the top-performing country music albums in the United States, published by Billboard.  In 1967, 17 different albums topped the chart, which was at the time published under the title Hot Country Albums, based on sales reports submitted by a representative sample of stores nationwide.

In the issue of Billboard dated January 7, Sonny James was at number one with the compilation album The Best of Sonny James, the record's third week in the top spot.  It was displaced from the top spot in the issue dated January 21 by Somebody Like Me by Eddy Arnold.  One of the biggest country stars of the 1960s, Arnold had four chart-topping albums in 1967 which spent a combined total of 18 weeks in the top spot, the most by any artist.  He also had the two longest unbroken runs atop the chart, spending seven weeks at number one with The Best of Eddy Arnold in the summer and six weeks in the top spot with Turn the World Around in November and December.  Three other acts also had more than one number one in 1967.  Buck Owens and his Buckaroos had three chart-toppers, but each spent only a single week at number one.  Jack Greene had two number ones, as did Sonny James, whose backing group the Southern Gentlemen received joint billing on the second of his two chart-toppers.

In October, Bobbie Gentry topped the chart with Ode to Billie Joe, named for her song of the same title, which had topped Billboards all-genre singles chart, the Hot 100, in August.  Gentry was only the third female singer to have a number-one country album in the near four-year history of the chart, following Connie Smith and Loretta Lynn.  Ode to Billie Joe also topped the magazine's overall Top LPs chart, displacing Sgt. Pepper's Lonely Hearts Club Band by the Beatles from the top spot.  Jack Greene also topped the country albums chart for the first time when There Goes My Everything reached the top spot in February.  Greene was at the peak of his career in 1967, winning the awards for Male Vocalist of the Year, Single of the Year and Album of the Year at the inaugural Country Music Association Awards ceremony, but his second chart-topping album of 1967 would prove to be the last of his career.  Wynn Stewart also reached number one for the first time in 1967 with It's Such a Pretty World Today, but its two weeks atop the chart would be his only appearance at number one; he continued to achieve hits into the early 1970s but his career then went into decline due to changing musical tastes and his problems with alcoholism.

Chart history

References

1967-related lists
1967
1967 record charts